Mwansa the Great is a 2011 film.

Synopsis
While trying to prove he is a hero, Mwansa does the unforgivable and accidentally breaks his big sister Shula's special mud doll. He goes on a quest not only to fix it, but to finally prove he is Mwansa the Great.

Awards
 FCAT 2011
 International Price - Silence, on court !

External links

 

2011 films
Zambian drama films